The 1982–83 Georgia Bulldogs basketball team represented the University of Georgia as a member of the Southeastern Conference during the 1982–83 NCAA men's basketball season. The team was led by head coach Hugh Durham, and played their home games at Stegeman Coliseum in Athens, Georgia. The Bulldogs won the SEC tournament, and continued their winning ways in the East Region of the NCAA tournament. They defeated #1 seed St. John's and #2 seed North Carolina to reach the Final Four for the first time in program history. The Bulldogs lost to Jim Valvano's famed North Carolina State Wolfpack to finish the season at 24–10.

Roster

Schedule and results

|-
!colspan=12 style=| Regular season

|-
!colspan=12 style=| SEC Tournament

|-
!colspan=12 style=| NCAA Tournament

Rankings

References

Georgia Bulldogs basketball seasons
Georgia
Georgia
NCAA Division I men's basketball tournament Final Four seasons
Georgia Bulldogs
Georgia Bulldogs